Carl Eduard Hermann Boese (26 August 1887 – 6 July 1958) was a German film director, screenwriter, and producer. He directed 158 films between 1917 and 1957.

Selected filmography

 Farmer Borchardt (1917)
 Donna Lucia (1918)
 The Stolen Sole (1918) - Director
 Nuri's Curse / Nissami's Song (1918) - Director
 The Geisha and the Samurai (1919)
 The Devil and the Madonna (1919)
 Nocturne of Love (1919)-Direct.
 The Golem: How He Came into the World (1920)
 The Dancer Barberina (1920)
 Three Nights (1920)
 The Song of the Puszta (1920)
 Blackmailed (1920)
 The Raft of the Dead (1921)
 The Shadow of Gaby Leed (1921)
 The Terror of the Red Mill (1921)
 Dolores (1922) - Director
 The Unwritten Law (1922)
 Slave for Life, director, producer
 Count Cohn (1923)
 Maciste and the Chinese Chest (1923)
 Slaves of Love (1924)
 War in Peace (1925)
 The Iron Bride (1925)
 Three Waiting Maids (1925)
 If You Have an Aunt (1925)
 The Marriage Swindler (1925)
 The Last Horse Carriage in Berlin (1926)
 The Man Without Sleep (1926)
 The Sea Cadet (1926)
 The Trumpets are Blowing (1926)
 Nanette Makes Everything (1926)
 Unmarried Daughters (1926)
 Give My Regards to the Blonde Child on the Rhine (1926)
 The Sporck Battalion (1927)
 The White Spider (1927)
 The Indiscreet Woman (1927)
 Sir or Madam (1928)
 Lemke's Widow (1928)
 When the Mother and the Daughter (1928)
 Eva in Silk (1928)
 The Page Boy at the Golden Lion (1928)
 Razzia (1929)
 Children of the Street (1929)
 Bobby, the Petrol Boy (1929)
 Painted Youth (1929)
 Alimente (1930)
 Marriage Strike (1930)
 Love Songs (1930) writer
 El amor solfeando (1930), writer
 The Kaiser's Detectives (1930)
 Rendezvous (1930)
 Three Days Confined to Barracks (1930)
 Without Meyer, No Celebration is Complete (1931)
 My Cousin from Warsaw (1931)
 Terror of the Garrison (1931)
 The Soaring Maiden (1931)
 Duty is Duty (1931)
 Grock (1931)
 The Unfaithful Eckehart (1931)
 No Money Needed (1932)
 You Will Be My Wife (1932)
 Theodor Körner
 The Cheeky Devil (1932)
 Paprika (1932)
 Paprika (1933)
 Homecoming to Happiness (1933)
 The Gentleman from Maxim's (1933)
 The Sandwich Girl (1933)
 A Woman Like You (1933)
 Gretel Wins First Prize (1933)
 Three Bluejackets and a Blonde (1933)
 Greetings and Kisses, Veronika (1933)
 The Lucky Diamond (1934)
 The Flower Girl from the Grand Hotel (1934)
 Miss Madame (1934)
 Bashful Felix (1934)
 Hearts are Trumps (1934)
 A Night on the Danube (1935)
 The King's Prisoner (1935)
 Adventure in Warsaw (1937)
 A Diplomatic Wife (1937)
 Five Million Look for an Heir (1938)
 Hello Janine! (1939)
 Three Fathers for Anna (1939)
 My Aunt, Your Aunt (1939)
 Everything for Gloria (1941)
 The Brambilla Family Go on Holiday (1941)
 The Wedding Hotel (1944)
 When Men Cheat (1950)
 The Chaste Libertine (1952)
 The Bogeyman (1953)
 The Uncle from America (1953)
 Josef the Chaste (1953)
 The Spanish Fly (1955)
 My Aunt, Your Aunt (1956)

References

External links

1887 births
1958 deaths
Film people from Berlin
German male writers